is a Japanese politician of the Liberal Democratic Party, a member of the House of Representatives in the Diet (national legislature).

Overview 
After graduating from Aoyama Gakuin University, Yamaguchi went to Paris to study at Paris IV University. During his stay there, he resolved to contribute to Japan as a politician. Yamaguchi was elected to the first of his four terms in the assembly of Tokushima Prefecture in 1975 and then to the House of Representatives of Japan for the first time in 1990.

Yamaguchi is affiliated with the openly revisionist organization Nippon Kaigi.

References

External links
  

Living people
1950 births
Aoyama Gakuin University alumni
Paris-Sorbonne University alumni
Members of Nippon Kaigi
Liberal Democratic Party (Japan) politicians
Members of the House of Representatives (Japan)
21st-century Japanese politicians